John Heston may refer to:

Ivano Staccioli,  Italian film actor, credited as John Heston
John W. Heston, American academic and president of Washington State University